Rushby is a surname. Notable people with the surname include:

John Rushby (born 1949), British computer scientist
Tom Rushby (1880–1962), English cricketer
George Gilman Rushby (1900–1968), English hunter
William Rushby (1888–1981), English footballer